"Hell of a Life" is a song by American hip hop recording artist Kanye West from his fifth studio album, My Beautiful Dark Twisted Fantasy (2010). The song was produced by West, Mike Caren, Ernest Wilson and Mike Dean. The song features a number of samples and contains backing vocals by Teyana Taylor, signed to West's G.O.O.D. Music label. The song features a production style with influence from rock and heavy metal music, and is notably bombastic and aggressive in nature. The song expresses a narrative about West marrying a pornographic film actress and the traumatic events that follow. It employs highly sexual, nightmarish imagery, and was inspired by West's relationship with model Amber Rose among other real-life events.

The song received mostly positive reviews from music critics who noted the song for its sexual subject matter, praising the performance provided by West and the aesthetically pleasing imagery created by the song. The song was featured during West's Coachella Music Festival setlist and briefly appeared in his short film Runaway, during a dinner sequence. It charted on the South Korean Gaon Chart at position 57.

Background
"Hell of a Life" was recorded in Oahu, Hawaii, along with the majority of My Beautiful Dark Twisted Fantasy. Kanye West had faced various media controversies and expressed a desire to record his next album in a reclusive manner, straying away from collaborating with artists he didn't consider himself personally familiar with. The track takes inspiration from "Iron Man", a song first recorded by British heavy metal band Black Sabbath from their second studio album Paranoid, which is also sampled on the song. Another source of music influence that the track drew from was Kraftwerk, an influential electronic music project from the 1970s. G.O.O.D. Music artist Teyana Taylor contributes backing vocals to the song, primarily within the last minute of the track.

Lyrically the song draws from West's relationship with model Amber Rose. West had first gotten into contact with Rose in 2008 and developed a romantic relationship with her. The couple had a dramatic break-up in 2010, due to allegations of adultery. The song is unique among songs featured on My Beautiful Dark Twisted Fantasy as it is the only song on the album featuring vocals solely provided by West, who chose to otherwise collaborate extensively on the project.

Composition

"Hell of a Life" tells the story of marriage between West and a porn star. The porn star in question has been interpreted as an allusion to Amber Rose, a former stripper. Along with "Iron Man", the song samples "She's My Baby," by Sylvester Stewart, and performed by The Mojo Men; and of "Stud-Spider" by Tony Joe White. It is inspired by psychedelic rock, and features baroque braggadocio inspired rapping delivered by West. Aesthetically the production of the song draws from both stoner rock and progressive rock. It has been described as "feverish", "nightmarish", "grimy" and "grotesque" in nature. The primarily bombastic production is littered with heavy synths and brooding, abrasive riffs. The song expresses West's thoughts on relations and features highly sexual themes and imagery, sneering at people who judge him negatively. During the song's climax, West muses "how could you say, 'They live their life wrong?" before launching into the repeated refrain of "when you never fuck with the lights on?" The melodic, riff-ridden chorus is sung by West, boasting about how "pussy and religion is all [he] need[s]." Pitchfork Media's Ryan Dombal summarized the song, writing:

"'Hell of a Life' attempts to bend its central credo-- 'no more drugs for me, pussy and religion is all I need'-- into a noble pursuit. As a woofer-mulching synth line lurks, Kanye justifies his dreams of not sleeping with but marrying a porn star, peaking with the combative taunt, 'How can you say they live they life wrong/ When you never fuck with the lights on.' Inspired by his two-year relationship with salacious model Amber Rose, the song blurs the line between fantasy and reality, sex and romance, love and religion, until no lines exist at all. It's a zonked nirvana with demons underneath; a fragile state that can't help but break apart on the very next song." 

According to IGN's Chad Grischow, the track is fueled by "the fuzzed-out synth and melody borrowed from Black Sabbath's 'Iron Man'," stating that "Hell of a Life" plays like it was inspired by "the latest season of Entourage, as Kanye falls hard for a porn star and spins rapidly out of control as he plans their future."

Reception

"Hell of a Life" garnered critical acclaim. David Amidon of PopMatters commented that much like every song on My Beautiful Dark Twisted Fantasy, the song "contains an underscore as ambitious as the beats upfront", concluding that tracks "Hell of a Life" and "So Appalled" alone "carry enough auditory sugar to make listening to this album on any regular sort of listening device almost a fool's errand." Chicago Sun-Times writer Thomas Conner cited the song as one of the album's "temporary highs" describing it as a "mixture of metal strut, Gothic keyboards and a bender gone off the rails." Andy Gill of The Independent cited the song as a highlight of My Beautiful Dark Twisted Fantasy, describing the song as a "brutal rumination on West's sexual appetite" and stating that the track contained a "buzzy synth motif" and "racing minimalist keyboard flourishes".

AbsolutePunk's Drew Beringer stated that the track featured a "sleazy beat", noting that the song "takes us further into West's dark psyche." J. Tinsley of the Smoking Section described the track as an admirable effort by West, but commented that it was one of the lesser tracks on the album ultimately. Andrew Barber of Complex complimented the song for successfully providing an escapism fantasy, musing that "Kanye takes us on a spaced-out journey to a world where excess is the norm—a world most of us will never encounter." Sean Highkin of the website Beats Per Minute cited the sampling of "Iron Man" as one of the album's most ambitious moments, writing that "any time Kanye has to make a choice between under and overdoing something, he always opts for the latter". Baron Zach of The Village Voice praised the story and production of the song, stating that the song contained a "great" sample. The song charted on South Korean Gaon Chart at position 57.

Marketing
The song was also featured as in Runaway, a 35-minute music video directed by West set to music from My Beautiful Dark Twisted Fantasy. The beginning of the song is featured at the end of the dinner sequence. The song was featured during West's setlist during his 2011 performance at Coachella. At a concert in New York City, West performed the song with Justin Vernon of folk band Bon Iver, a musician who West had extensively collaborated with on the album. Vernon sang the chorus while West provided the rapping verses.

Personnel
Credits adapted from the liner notes for My Beautiful Dark Twisted Fantasy (2010).
Produced by Kanye West
Co-produced by Mike Caren, No I.D. and Mike Dean
Recorded by Andrew Dawson, Anthony Kilhoffer and Mike Dean at the Avex Recording Studio, Honolulu and Noah Goldstein at Electric Lady Studios, NYC
Mixed by Mike Dean, Anthony Kilhoffer and Andrew Dawson at Electric Lady Studios, NYC & Platinum Sound Recording, NYC – Assisted by Gaylord Holomalia, Christian Mochizuki and Pete Bischoff
Additional drum programming: Anthony Kilhoffer
Keyboards: Mike Dean
Additional vocals: Teyana Taylor & The-Dream

Chart position

Certifications

References

External links 
  (34:33)

2010 songs
Kanye West songs
Song recordings produced by Kanye West
Song recordings produced by Mike Dean (record producer)
Song recordings produced by No I.D.
Songs about marriage
Songs written by Bill Ward (musician)
Songs written by Geezer Butler
Songs written by Kanye West
Songs written by Mike Caren
Songs written by Mike Dean (record producer)
Songs written by No I.D.
Songs written by Ozzy Osbourne
Songs written by Sly Stone
Songs written by Tony Iommi
Songs written by Tony Joe White